Moulay el-Ksour Mosque may refer to:

Buildings 
 Mosque of the Cat in Marrakesh
 The Zawiya (religious complex) of Abdallah al-Ghazwani, who is also known as Moulay el-Ksour, also in Marrakesh

Mosque disambiguation pages